Josipdol is a village and municipality in Karlovac County, Croatia. It is part of Lika region.

Geography
Josipdol is situated in the Ogulin-Plaški valley which together with Lika and Gorski Kotar forms Mountainous Croatia. The town is located at the crossroads of state roads D-23, which connects Karlovac and Senj (Jozefin road), and D-42, which connects Vrbovsko and Plitvice. Josipdol is located 10 km southeast from Ogulin, 14 km northwest from Plaški and 45 km southwest from Karlovac.

Demographics

According to the 2011 census, the town had a population of 879 with a total municipality population of 3,773, of which 90% were Croats and 9% were Serbs. Serbs form the majority in the village of Trojvrh.

History

Scarce archaeological remains near Oštarije village show that the area was settled in the Neolithic. Remains from the Copper Age show that the area was the southernmost part of Lasinja culture. The first known inhabitants of the area were the Illyrian tribe of Japods, which lived here from the late Bronze Age. In this area the Japods had two strongholds, Tetrapones, east of today's town Josipdol and Metulum, north of the town. On the north the Japods bordered with Celts and random remains of Celtic coins were found in the area.

In the period 35-33 B.C. future Roman Emperor Octavian conquered the Japod areas and incorporated them into the Roman Empire. Although no physical remains of any Roman road has been found it is believed that through this area passed the Yantar road, which connected the Baltic with the Adriatic. During this period Metulum had municipality status which is proved by a script from Diocletian's time.

In the 7th century Slavs came to colonize the Balkan area and founded a settlement Modruš in the Josipdol area. In the 9th century, Modruš is mentioned as the site of the Borna and Ljudevit Posavski confrontation. In 1102 Croatia joined personal union with Hungary and the Hungarians formed new territorial units called Župas; Modruš became the seat of one of these Župas and soon became the seat of the Krbava-Modruš episcopacy.

In the 12th century, Modruš became a possession of the Frankopan family. Because it was on a road that connected the interior with the coast, Modruš became an important traffic and trade center. This was the golden age for Modruš, which lasted until wars with the Ottomans in the 15th century, when it was raided several times.

As Croatia became part of the Habsburg empire Modruš became part of the Military Frontier and a new population settled the area. In 1775, emperor Joseph II visited Josipdol. In 1776, Austrian authorities began to build the road that would connect Karlovac with Senj and Josipdol was founded as a traffic and trade center on the road. The road was named Josephina and it is still in use today.

During the Kingdom of Yugoslavia, a railway from Ogulin to Split was built which passed Josipdol. The railway accelerated the industrial growth of the town and a wood industry was founded.

The Croatian War of Independence (1991–1995) affected the south-eastern part of the municipality, which led to depopulation of the area.

In the 21st century it was one of the centers where the Zagreb-Split motorway was built and many locals found jobs in constructing it. In 2003 the first part of the road was opened on the Bosiljevo-Josipdol part.

Economy

Economy is mostly based on agriculture, harvesting potatoes, mushrooms and fruit. There also couple of smaller sawmills. In 2003 municipality experienced economic boom because of building motorway Zagreb-Split nearby. Josipdol was one of the construction centers and many locals found job in construction of motorway.

Towns and villages in municipality

References

External links

 

Municipalities of Croatia
Populated places in Karlovac County